The 2023 Suncorp Super Netball season will be the seventh season of the premier netball league in Australia. The season will commence on Saturday 18 March and will conclude with the Grand Final on Saturday 8 July. The defending premiers are the West Coast Fever.

Teams

Key

Contracted Signings
Important dates in relation to player signings for the 2023 season are:
 2 May 2022 – 3 July 2022: Clubs have an exclusive window to re-sign any of their existing contracted players, or any of their existing permanent or temporary replacement players. Clubs can also sign any player who was not contracted to another team, either as a squad member, replacement player or a training partner in 2022.
 4 July 2022 – 22 July 2022: The period for free agency signings is open, and players can be contracted by any club without restriction. By 22 July all clubs must have signed 10 senior contracted players to their list.
 25 July 2022 – 10 March 2023: Training partners can be signed.

Players were permitted to sign one-year contracts, owing to the expiration of Netball Australia's collective bargaining agreement with the players.

The following table is a list of players who moved clubs/leagues into Super Netball, or were elevated to a permanent position in the senior team during the off-season. It does not include contracted players who were re-signed by their original Super Netball clubs.

Team List

Notes: Injuries, Retirements, Coaching Changes, Team Changes

 Jemma Donoghue had signed with the Giants as a training partner for the 2023 season but was approached by Netball Superleague Team, Leeds Rhinos to join their squard for the remainder of their season and took the offer. There has been no announcement if and who her replacement training partner is.
 Reilley Batcheldor had signed with Sunshine Coast Lightning but during the Australian National Championship, she suffered a ACL injury and will miss some of the 2023 season. Charlie Bell has been brought in to replace Reilley in the contracted 10 for Lightning after signing as a Training Partner for the Queensland Firebirds.
 Kate Walsh had signed with the Sunshine Coast Lightning but in November 2022, Kate decided to retire from National and International netball, Ash Ervin is her replacement after signing as a Training Partner for the Queensland Firebirds 
 Tara Hincliffe had signed with the Sunshine Coast Lightning but in February 2023 at the Team Girls cup she suffered a ACL injury and will miss the 2023 Season, her replacement has not been announced yet
 Rahni Samason has injured her leg and will miss some of the 2023 season, her replacement has not been announced yet.
 Gretel Bueta is currently pregnant with her second child and will not be playing the 2023 season, Emily Moore is her replacement.
 Sara Francis Bayman was the assistant coach for the queesland firebirds but on the 13th of March it was announced that she was no longer the assistant coach, the search is on for a new assistant coach for the firebirds- Noting announced yet.
 Nyah Allen will miss the first half of the season due to an ongoing Chest injury which she has had surgery for, Kelly Singleton is her replacement

Suncorp Team Girls Cup 2023
 Source: Click here
For the second conseuctive year, the pre-season Suncorp Team Girls Cup competition was staged. The round-robin and playoff tournament was held at the Gold Coast Sports and Leisure Centre from Friday 24 February to Sunday 26 February. The eight Super Netball teams were split into two groups of four and play each of their group opponents once, before playing an inter-group match to determine places from first to eighth.

The tournament was won by the West Coast Fever, who defeated the Adelaide Thunderbirds 49-41 in the final.

Pool A Matches

Pool B Matches

Finals

Regular Season
 Source: Click here (all times are in local time)

Round 1

Round 2

Round 3

Round 4

Round 5

Round 6

Round 7

Round 8 - Inclusion Round

Round 9

Round 10

Round 11 - First Nations Round (Week 1)

Round 12 - First Nations Round (Week 2)

Round 13

Round 14

Ladder
TBD

Finals Series

Major Semi Final

Minor Semi Final

Preliminary Final

Grand Final

 Grand Final MVP Winner:

References

External links
 

2023
2023 in Australian netball